Cymbopogon schoenanthus, the camel grass, camel's hay, straw of Mecca, fever grass, geranium grass, or West Indian lemon grass, is a herbal plant of Southern Asia and Northern Africa, with fragrant foliage.

Uses
Cymbopogon schoenanthus is often made into a common herbal tea. C. schoenanthus oil (called lemongrass oil or camel grass oil) is also used as a tonic and fragrance additive in personal care and cosmetic products such as hair dye, shampoo/conditioner, moisturizer/lotion, bath oil, exfoliant/scrub, anti-aging treatment, and acne treatment.

Synonyms
 Cymbopogon schoenanthus (L.) Spreng.
 Andropogon schoenanthus L.
 Andropogon ivarancusa Boiss.
 Andropogon laniger Desf. var. ivarancusa
 Vernacular names:  (Songhai),  (Malagasy), beignefala (Colons),  (Senufo),  (Tagwana),  (Bambara),  (Dyula),  (Baoulé),  (Abron), fimou (Koulango),  (Mossi), natarnoza (Gurunsi),  (Tamoul),  (Hassaniya), idjikim (Sahara occidental), lemmad, I-med (Southern Algeria),  (Tuareg):, sa'rat et-trab, a'mud es-sgir (Marrakesh region),  (local French),  (Gbaya Bossangoa dialect)...

See also
 Cymbopogon, genus including other species of lemon grass

References

External links
Kew GrassBase Species Profile
 
Definition of camel grass plant: Malagasy dictionary (Madagascar) izay anaovan' ny olona fisotro toy ny dite ("...used by people as a tea-like drink...")

schoenanthus
Grasses of Africa
Grasses of Asia
Flora of North Africa
Flora of the Arabian Peninsula
Flora of Western Asia